Peter Roberts is a former British councillor who was Leader of Rochdale Borough Council from 1997-2006.

Career

Rochdale Borough Council
He became (Labour) Deputy Leader of the council in 1996, then Leader in 1997. Labour lost control of the council in 2003. In the 2006 elections, the Lib Dems took over the council, and Alan Taylor became Leader of the council; Alan Taylor, Leader from 2006–10, died aged 75 in May 2019.

Personal life
He lives just north of Rochdale Infirmary. He is married to Jill

References

Living people
Councillors in Greater Manchester
Labour Party (UK) councillors
Local government in the Metropolitan Borough of Rochdale
People from Rochdale
Year of birth missing (living people)
Leaders of local authorities of England